The 2001 Taça de Angola was the 20th edition of the Taça de Angola, the second most important and the top knock-out football club competition following the Girabola. Sonangol do Namibe beat Sporting de Cabinda 3-2 in the final to secure its 1st title.

The winner qualified to the 2002 African Cup Winners' Cup.

Stadiums and locations

Championship bracket
The knockout rounds were played according to the following schedule:
 May 16 - preliminary rounds
 Jul 18 - Sep 5: Round of 16
 Oct 10 - Sep 12: Quarter-finals
 Oct 31: Semi-finals
 Nov 11: Final

Preliminary rounds

1/16 finals

Quarter-finals

Semi-finals

Final

See also
 2001 Girabola
 2002 Angola Super Cup
 2002 African Cup Winners' Cup
 Sonangol do Namibe players
 Sporting de Cabinda players

External links
 profile at rsssf.com

References

Angola Cup
2001 in Angolan football
Angola